Char Kaman (literally "meaning four gates") are four historical structures in Hyderabad, India. It is located near Charminar. After the completion of Charminar, at about 75m feet to its north, four lofty arches known as Charkaman were built in 1592 by the Qutb Shahi dynasty. 

The names of the four arches are Charminar Kaman, Machli Kaman, Kali Kaman and Sher-e-Batil-Ki-Kaman. The arches are fifty feet high, and demarcate an open square, in front of which a Qutb Shahi palace once existed. Scholar Omar Khalidi notes that the Char Kaman conceptually resembles the Registan constructed in Samarqand, Uzbekistan by the Timurids.

In 1858, the monument was rehabilitated by the fifth Nizam of Hyderabad, Afzal-ud-Daulah. 
Charkaman is notified as a heritage structure by INTACH

References

Heritage structures in Hyderabad, India
Qutb Shahi architecture